"Velvet" is the second single by The Big Pink, and their first single with the 4AD label. "Velvet" was released as a digital download and on 7-inch vinyl on April 20, 2009, and was later included on their debut album A Brief History of Love in September 2009. "Velvet" was re-issued as a single on February 15, 2010. The song was self-produced by the band, and mixed by producer Alan Moulder. The 7-inch single features the exclusive B-side "An Introduction to Awareness", while the 12-inch single features a cover version of Otis Redding's 1964 song "These Arms of Mine".

Pitchfork Media described "Velvet" as "undeniably immense, but it's a tribute to the Big Pink's skill and maturity that it still manages to sound intimate," and awarded the track a 7 out of 10 rating. In August 2009, "Velvet" was included on Pitchfork's Top 500 Tracks of the 2000s list, voted in at number 500. On Pitchfork's end-of-the-year Top 100 Tracks of 2009 list, "Velvet" was voted at #42.

A 7-minute remix of "Velvet" by Gang Gang Dance followed the original single release in May 2009 as an online-streaming single. Remixes by Mount Kimbie and Van Rivers & The Subliminal Kid (producers for Fever Ray) were also commissioned.

The song was commonly covered by Swedish artist Lykke Li during her 2011 Wounded Rhymes Tour.

Track listing
7" vinyl (AD 2915) and download
 "Velvet" – 4:15
 "An Introduction to Awareness" – 4:22

2010 12" vinyl re-issue (BAD 3X09) and download
 "Velvet" – 4:15
 "Velvet" (Perversion) – 3:46
 "These Arms of Mine" (Otis Redding cover) – 2:37

Remixes
 "Velvet" (BDG Remix by Gang Gang Dance), 6:50 – available as a free download on the band's website in May 2009, and later included on a one-sided/etched pink-and-black-coloured 12" single with limited edition vinyl pressings of A Brief History of Love in September 2009.
 "Velvet" (Mount Kimbie Remix), 3:12 – available on a 4AD promo CD-R of "Velvet" remixes, and also included on the band's Japanese EP This Is Our Time in June 2009.
 "Velvet" (Van Rivers & The Subliminal Kid Remix), 4:01 – also available on a promo CD-R of "Velvet" remixes, and as one of three exclusive bonus tracks featured on the Japanese pressing of A Brief History of Love.

Credits

2009 release
 All music and vocals by Robbie Furze and Milo Cordell.
"Velvet"
 Produced by The Big Pink.
 Lauren Jones – vocals.
 Akiko Matsuura – drums.
 Engineered by Jimmy Robertson.
 Mixed by Alan Moulder at Assault and Battery.
 Recorded at The Big Pink and at Miloco Garden, London.
"An Introduction to Awareness"
 Produced and recorded by The Big Pink.
 Mixed by Al O'Connell.
 Recorded and mixed at The Big Pink.
 Art direction and design by Vaughan Oliver and Chris Bigg at v23.
 Photography by Marc Atkins at panoptika.net.

2010 release
 All music and vocals by Robbie Furze and Milo Cordell.
"Velvet" (Perversion)
 Performed by Milo Cordell, Robbie Furze, Akiko Matsuura, and Daniel O'Sullivan.
 Produced, recorded, and mixed by The Big Pink.
 "These Arms of Mine"
 Written by Otis Redding.
 Produced, recorded, and mixed by The Big Pink.
 Art direction and design by Edward Quarmby.
 Photography by Marc Atkins at panoptika.net.

References

The Big Pink songs
2009 singles
2010 singles
4AD singles
2009 songs